Chen Qiuqi (born July 4, 1980 in Mei County (now Meixian District), Guangdong) is a female Chinese field hockey player who competed at the 2004 Summer Olympics.

She finished fourth with the Chinese team in the women's competition. She played all six matches and scored one goal.

External links
 
 Athens 2004 profile at Yahoo Sports
 
 

1980 births
Living people
Field hockey players at the 2004 Summer Olympics
Field hockey players at the 2008 Summer Olympics
Sportspeople from Meizhou
Olympic field hockey players of China
Chinese female field hockey players
Olympic silver medalists for China
People from Meixian District
Olympic medalists in field hockey
Asian Games medalists in field hockey
Sportspeople from Guangdong
Hakka sportspeople
Medalists at the 2008 Summer Olympics
Field hockey players at the 2002 Asian Games
Field hockey players at the 2006 Asian Games
Asian Games gold medalists for China
Medalists at the 2006 Asian Games
Medalists at the 2002 Asian Games
21st-century Chinese women